Yelkenci was a  refrigerated cargo ship which was built in 1943 for the Ministry of War Transport (MoWT) as Empire Camp. She was sold in 1946 and renamed Valacia. In 1951, she was sold and renamed New York City. A further sale in 1955 saw her renamed Loch Morar. A final sale to Turkish owners saw her renamed Yelkenci. She served with them until scrapped in 1971.

Description
The ship was built by Short Brothers Ltd, Sunderland. She was launched on 17 June 1943 and completed in November 1943.

Refrigeration was provided by two compressors and eight cooling machines made by L Sterne & Co Ltd. The cooling machines used ammonia as a coolant. Insulation was by direct expansion, air, cork and slag wool.

Her GRT was 7,052 and she had a NRT of 4,760.

The engine was built by North East Marine Engine Co (1938) Ltd, Newcastle upon Tyne.

History
Empire Camp was built for the MoWT. She was placed under the management of Blue Star Line Ltd. Her port of registry was Sunderland. The Code Letters BFKR were allocated. Her Official Number was 169124.

Empire Camp was a member of a number of convoys during the Second World War.

HX 306
Convoy HX 306 departed New York on 31 August 1944 and arrived at Liverpool on 17 September. Empire Camp joined the convoy at Halifax, Nova Scotia on 2 September. She was carrying general cargo and a cargo of fish, bound for Manchester.

MKS 75G
Convoy MKS 75G departed Gibraltar on 1 December 1945 bound for Liverpool.

During 1945, management was transferred to Cunard White Star Line Co Ltd. In 1946, Empire Camp was sold to Cunard White Star Line and renamed Valacia. Her port of registry was changed to Liverpool. She was the second Cunard White Star Line ship to carry the name Valacia. In 1950, Valacia was sold the Bristol City Line of Steamships Ltd and renamed New York City, the fourth ship to bear that name for Bristol City Line. She was placed under the management of Charles Hill & Sons Ltd, Bristol. In 1955, she was sold to Glasgow United Shipping Co Ltd and renamed Loch Morar and placed under the management of Mackay & MacIntyre Ltd, Glasgow. In 1959, she was sold to Lütfi Yelkenci Evlatlari Donmata Iştiraki, Istanbul and renamed Yelkenci. She served until 1971, arriving at Istanbul on 20 February 1971 for scrapping.

References

External links
Photo of Empire Camp
Photograph of New York City
Photo of Yelkenci
Photo of Yelkenci

1943 ships
Ships built on the River Wear
Steamships of the United Kingdom
Ministry of War Transport ships
Empire ships
Merchant ships of the United Kingdom
Cargo ships of Turkey
Steamships of Turkey